Laszlo Ubori (born 5 August 1951) is a Yugoslav sprinter. He competed in the men's 4 × 400 metres relay at the 1972 Summer Olympics. He is libing in Subotica. He was also part of Men’s 4x400 meters when they won 3 times Balakans olimpics

References

1951 births
Living people
Athletes (track and field) at the 1972 Summer Olympics
Serbian male sprinters
Yugoslav male sprinters
Olympic athletes of Yugoslavia
People from Novi Kneževac